People's Republic of China first competed at the Paralympic Games in 1984, at the Summer Games in New York City, United States and Stoke Mandeville, United Kingdom. Since the 2004 Summer Paralympics, China has topped the medal table with more gold medals, more silver medals and more medals overall than any other nation at every Summer Paralympics.

As of 2022, China finished first in the Summer Paralympics fifth times and first once in the Winter Paralympics. With the nation's 10th appearance at the Summer and 6th appearance at the Winter Paralympics, China is the most successful country overall in the Asia, making them the 3rd most successful country in the All-time Paralympic Games medal table.

Despite having competed at every Winter Games since Salt Lake City in 2002, China did not win a single medal until at the 2018 Winter Paralympics, where China won their first ever gold medal as well as the first medal in the wheelchair curling competition. While four years later at home during the 2022 Winter Paralympics, China won medals at all six sports, topped the medal table for the first time on Winter Paralympics, and became the most successful appearance of an Asian nation, as well as China's best appearance at a Winter Paralympics.

Medal by games

Medal tables

Red border color indicates host nation status.

Medals by Summer Games

Medals by Winter Games

Medal by sports 
Chinese athletes have won medals in most of the current Summer Paralympics sports.
The exceptions are paratriathlon, equestrian, wheelchair rugby, wheelchair tennis and paracanoe.

Summer Games

Winter Games 

Best results in non-medaling sports:

Flagbearer

Summer Games

Winter Games

Multi medallists

Athletes who have won more than three gold medals or five medals:

Multi medals at single Games
This is a list of Chinese athletes who have won at least two gold medals in a single Games. Ordered categorically by gold medals earned, sports then year.

Multi medals at a single event
This is a list of Chinese athletes who have won at least two gold medals in a single event at the Summer Paralympics. Ordered categorically by medals earned, sports then gold medals earned.

See also
Paralympic competitors for China
Sports in China
Disability in China
China at the Olympics

References